Sayville School District (also referred to as Sayville Public Schools or Sayville Union Free School District) is a public school district encompassing the hamlets of Sayville West Sayville and a small part of Oakdale, in the Town of Islip, Suffolk County, New York, United States.

The superintendent is Dr. Marc Ferris.

Enrollment
The total enrollment for the 2007–2008 school year was 3,434 students.
A high percentage of graduates goes on to higher education each year, to prestigious universities such as Princeton, Cornell, Brown, Columbia, Yale, Duke, Harvard, MIT, and R.P.I.

History
In 1888, a notable wooden public school building was constructed on Greene Avenue, which was used by the school system until about 1958.  Adelphi University also used the building for a period of time in the early 1960s.  In 1964, the building was renovated for school administration use.  "Old 88" burned down in a fire in December 1969, and a marker was placed in its memory in 2000.

In 1998, the district was the first on Long Island to approve breathalyzer testing of students.

Schools
 Sayville High School, Principal-Ronald Hoffer
 Sayville Middle School Principal-Joseph Castoro
 Cherry Avenue Elementary School Principal-  Dr. Lisa Ihne
 Lincoln Avenue Elementary School Principal- Mrs. Christine Carlson
 Sunrise Drive Elementary School Principal-  Dr. James Foy

References

External links
 Sayville Public Schools

Islip (town), New York
School districts in New York (state)
Education in Suffolk County, New York